Fort Whipple is a former United States (U.S.) Army post originally established at Del Rio Springs, north of present day Chino Valley, Arizona, and later relocated to a site in present day Prescott, Arizona.

History
The initial post was established by Major Edward Banker Willis and Captain Nathaniel J. Pishon on December 23, 1863. They led Companies C and F of the First California Volunteers and built the post under General Order #27 issued by General James Henry Carleton.  The post was named Fort Whipple, after Amiel Weeks Whipple, an American military officer and topographical engineer. He served as a brigadier general in the American Civil War, and was mortally wounded on May 7, 1863, at the Battle of Chancellorsville in Virginia.

The Governor’s Party arrived at Fort Whipple on January 22, 1864. Consisting of most of the officials of the new territorial government of Arizona, Governor John Noble Goodwin used the fort as his headquarters while he visited the territory to determine a permanent location for the fort and territorial capital.

On May 18, 1864, Major Willis relocated the fort twenty-one miles south to a miner's tent settlement on the east bank of Granite Creek. The relocation of the fort was recommended by Governor Goodwin. Its placement was on higher ground, had better access to lumber, and the military could better protect miners.  The fort was a large rectangular pine-log stockade. At the same time, Whipple Depot was established as part of the fort. In late May, Prescott (approximately 1½ miles west of the fort) was designated as the capital of the Arizona Territory. In setting up the territorial government, Goodwin's administration oversaw the first election of members to the 1st Arizona Territorial Legislature in July 1864. In September 1864, they met in Prescott and adopted the Howell Code, which was the first set of statutory laws to govern the territory. The legislature also enacted legislation establishing the Arizona Historical Society, creation of mail routes, and establishing a public education system, which included a public university (the University of Arizona). The legislature's meeting in Prescott made it the de facto capital of the territory.

The old site at Del Rio Springs continued to be used by scouting parties and was called Camp Clark, in honor of John A. Clark, Surveyor General of the New Mexico Territory. The camp site was later sold, becoming Postle's Ranch.

Fort Whipple served as a tactical base for detachments of several regiments involved in the American Indian Wars between 1864 and 1886. Fort Whipple became headquarters of the Military Department of Arizona from 1870 to 1886 when Colonel George Crook was assigned to Fort Whipple. He was responsible for having a new fort built to replace the decrepit palisade fort. Between 1869 and 1872, the old fort stockade was razed and the majority of new construction occurred up until 1877. 

Whipple Depot was destroyed by fire in April 1872 and rebuilt by July 1872. In 1878, Whipple Depot was renamed Prescott Barracks. In May 1879, under General Orders #53, Prescott Barracks and Fort Whipple were consolidated to become Whipple Barracks.

From May 1885 to July 1886, Fort Whipple was home to Colonel Benjamin Grierson and Troop B of the 10th Cavalry Regiment (United States), also known as Buffalo Soldiers. By 1895, the fort was dilapidated and in 1897 was scheduled for deactivation. 

In April 1898 when the United States declared war on Spain, the U.S. Army reopened Whipple Barracks as a point of muster for Arizona volunteers. 200 volunteers were recruited and called the “Arizona Cowboy Regiment”. They departed on May 4, 1898, to assemble in San Antonio, Texas. Officially called the 1st U.S. Volunteer Cavalry, they were nicknamed the “Rough Riders” and fought in Cuba.

Whipple Barracks was inactive between 1899 and 1902, and then reactivated in April 1902 to house troops. New barracks, buildings and quarters were constructed between 1903 and 1908. Four companies (about 500 soldiers' total) moved in. 

The Prescott and Mount Union Railway operated an electric trolley passenger service between downtown Prescott and Fort Whipple from 1905 to 1912.

Arizona became a state in 1912. Troops stationed at Whipple Barracks were reassigned to other locations, and in 1913 Whipple Barracks was placed in a caretaker/un-garrisoned post status in 1913, and overseen by a small maintenance crew.

In 1918 during World War I, the U.S. Army reactivated Whipple Barracks as U.S. Army General Hospital #20. The hospital was designed to treat soldiers with respiratory illnesses, primarily tuberculosis (TB). Construction of new wards and other auxiliary buildings took place, including buildings for the American Red Cross and Young Men’s Christian Association (YMCA) organizations.

In 1920 the property was loaned to the U.S. Public Health Service (USPHS) and operated under a permit from the War Department. The USPHS operated Whipple Barracks until Executive Order 3669  was signed on April 29, 1922. This executive order transferred the permit and functions of the hospital to the newly established U.S. Veterans Bureau. The hospital designation became Hospital #50, Whipple Barracks, Arizona. The hospital retained its primary function in treating former soldiers with tuberculosis. The facility became one of the most complete sanatoriums for the treatment of tuberculosis in the country.

On July 3, 1930, Public Law Number 536 authorized President Hoover by executive order to consolidate the U.S. Veterans Bureau along with several agencies focused on the treatment of veterans to become the Veterans Administration (VA). March 4, 1931, was the official date transferring the Whipple Barracks title and property from the War Department to the newly-established Veterans Administration.

The main hospital building (Building 107) was constructed between 1938 and 1939, and opened to receive patients in October 1939. 

In July 1959, the VA re-designated Whipple VA hospital as a general medical and surgical hospital, in part due to the decline of tuberculosis patient load and increase of medical and surgical load. 

On May 17, 1964, The Veterans Administration celebrated the 100-year anniversary of Fort Whipple. Medical Center Director Kenneth .J. O’Brien presided over the ceremony. 

In March 1989, the Veterans Administration became a cabinet-agency and was renamed as the United States Department of Veterans Affairs (VA). 

During 1995, a reorganization of the entire agency occurred to refocus and address a variety of veteran’s healthcare needs. The VA hospital in Prescott along with the other VA clinics that served the northern Arizona region was officially named the Northern Arizona VA Health Care System (NAVAHCS).

On April 17, 2004, the VA hospital/medical center complex at Prescott, Arizona, was renamed the Bob Stump Department of Veterans Affairs Medical Center, after Congressman Stump, Chairman of the House Armed Services Committee. 

Significant expansion and construction has occurred throughout the time when the VA acquired Whipple Barracks. Notable buildings include the Community Living Center (Building 148), which was built in two phases, Phase 1 between 1987 and 1989, and Phase 2 between 1995 and 1997; the Domiciliary (Building 151) built between 1988 and 1990; the new Outpatient Mental Health building (Building 161) built between 2014 and 2015; the new Pharmacy/Laboratory building built between 2016 and 2018.

Certified on the  National Register of Historic Places in 1999 by the National Park Service, the historic name of Fort Whipple is listed as “Fort Whipple/Department of Veterans Affairs Medical Center Historic District”.

Fort Whipple Museum and other historic structures

Former military officer's quarters, Building 11 is now Fort Whipple Museum. The museum opened in 2004 and is painted light yellow and dark green. Fort Whipple Museum has artifacts and historical displays about the fort and hospital, including medical instruments, Army weaponry, the Buffalo Soldiers, maps, and photographs. The museum is operated as a joint project of the Sharlot Hall Museum and the Northern Arizona VA Health Care System, Bob Stump VA Medical Center in Prescott, Arizona. The museum is open from 10 a.m. to 4 p.m. on Thursdays, Fridays and Saturdays.

Also pictured are the historic buildings that were built between 1903 and 1908:
 The Fort Whipple Officers' Quarters
 The Fort Whipple NCO Quarters
 The Fort Whipple Army Barracks
 The Fort Whipple Post Headquarters
 The Fort Whipple Post Hospital
 The Fort Whipple Theater
 The Fort Whipple Guardhouse

Original location

References

External links
 Fort Whipple Museum – A Sharlot Hall Museum and Northern Arizona VA Health Care System Joint Venture
 National Register of Historic Places – Fort Whipple/Department of Veterans Affairs Medical Center Historic District, Prepared by Nancy L. Burgess, Preservation Consultant, October 29, 1999
 Historic Photos, Category – Military, Sharlot Hall Archives & Library.
 The History of Fort Whipple thesis, by Phillip D. Yoder, The University of Arizona, 1951
 Fort Whipple Reconstruction Photos, c. 1905–1908, Arizona Historical Society Archives
 This Day in History, April 2nd, Fort Whipple, Arizona Memory Project, Arizona Historical Society
 National Register of Historic Places – United States 2nd Generation Veterans Hospitals, Prepared by Cultural Resource Analysts, Inc., October 24, 2011
 Whipple Barracks, Arizona Map, January–March 1909, National Archives Catalog ID# 103396459
 Curtis, Charles A., Army Life in the West (1862–1865): Civil War Memoir of Charles A. Curtis in New Mexico and Arizona. CreateSpace Independent Publishing Platform, 2017. , 364 pages.
 VA History Feature Stories - Fort Whipple, Arizona VA: 1864 to Today, National VA History Office
 Fort Whipple, Yavapai County, Arizona, The Historical Marker Database

Days Past articles, a collaborative project of the Sharlot Hall Museum and the Prescott Corral of Westerners International
 Remembered Names and Forgotten Faces of Fort Whipple, by Al Bates, Apr 3, 1999.
 Fort Whipple’s Miss Carrie: “The Colonels’ Daughter, by Mick Woodcock, June 19, 1999
 Fort Whipple's Early Days, by Al Bates, July 31, 1999.
 People Before Days of the Empire at Fort Whipple, by Al Bates, November 6, 1999
 Heliographs: The Talking Mirrors of Whipple, Glassford, by James H. Riddle, January 15, 2000
 More on the Talking Mirrors in Yavapai County, by James H. Riddle, January 22, 2000
 The Days of Empire at Fort Whipple, by Al Bates, February 26, 2000
 From Fort to Veteran’s Affairs: The Latest Chapter of Whipple, by Al Bates, May 27, 2000
  Many Prescott places take their name from 1850s surveyor by Harley G. Shaw, August 5, 2000
 Del Rio's Quick Brush with the Seat of Government, by Terry Munderloh, October 14, 2000
 The Fort Whipple Next to Arlington Cemetery?, by Pat Kilkenney, November 18, 2000
 Del Rio Springs after Fort Whipple moved on, by Terry Munderloh, January 13, 2001
 Robert Postle: Officer, Gentlemen, Gambler and Rancher, by Al Bates, May 19, 2001
 Fire and Events at Whipple and the Elks Theater Defined 1928, by John Paulsen, December 28, 2002
 Five-Cent Ride Down Gurley Street – Part 1,  by Norman Delucchi, June 17, 2006
 Five-Cent Ride Down Gurley Street – Part 2, by Norman Delucchi, June 24, 2006
 Fort Whipple’s Talented Engineer: Lt. Earl D. Thomas, by Tom Collins, September 22, 2007
 Fort Whipple’s First Telegraph: A Turning Point in Prescott’s History, by Tom Collins, May 31, 2008
 Fort Whipple: Territorial Fort to VA Medical Complex – Part 1, by Al Bates, January 14, 2012
 Fort Whipple: Territorial Fort to VA Medical Complex – Part 2, by Al Bates, January 21, 2012
 A Little Known Aspect of Life at Fort Whipple, by Mick Woodcock, May 18, 2013
 General A.V. Kautz:"The Great Mogul" - Part 1, by Andrew Wallace, May 25, 2013
 General A.V. Kautz:"The Great Mogul" - Part 2, by Andrew Wallace, June 1, 2013
 The Tenth U.S. Cavalry at Fort Whipple, by John Langellier, June 22, 2013
 Founding Fort Whipple “Set in Motion Machinery of Civil Government”, by Al Bates, December 21, 2013
 The Governor’s Party Reaches Fort Whipple – In Segments, by Al Bates, January 18, 2014
 Arizona Territory’s First Newspaper Begins its Publication at Fort Whipple, by Al Bates, March 8, 2014
 A Frontier Fort on Granite Creek – Part 1, by Mick Woodcock, March 14, 2015
 A Frontier Fort on Granite Creek – Part 2, by Mick Woodcock, March 21, 2015
 New Life for an Old Fort: Instead of Closure, Fort Whipple is Rejuvenated, by Mick Woodcock, May 9, 2015
 Fort Whipple Becomes a Public Health Service Hospital in 1918, by Mick Woodcock, May 16, 2015
 The Final Steps from Frontier Fort to Veterans Hospital, by Mick Woodcock, May 23, 2015
 Charles Leib: Eastern Politician, Territorial Contract Surgeon, by Al Bates, August 15, 2015
  The Arizona Miner: Prescott's First Newspaper, by Fred Veil, September 15, 2018
  Construction Boom at Fort Whipple, 1905–1908, by Worcester P. Bong, September 21, 2019
  The Story Behind the Main Hospital at VA Prescott, 1939, by Worcester P. Bong, February 1, 2020
   If These Gates Could Talk, by Worcester P. Bong, April 4, 2020
  Bad Boys in Blue, Part 1, by Mick Woodcock, April 11, 2020
  Bad Boys in Blue, Part 2, by Mick Woodcock, April 18, 2020
  Bad Boys in Blue, Part 3, by Mick Woodcock, April 25, 2020
   Celebrating National Hospital Day, by Worcester P. Bong, May 9, 2020
  Take a Ride on the Whipple Stage Line, by Worcester P. Bong, August 1, 2020
  A Walk Through Whipple Barracks, Part 1, by Mick Woodcock, November 3, 2020
  Raymond W. Bliss, Commanding Officer of Whipple Barracks – 1919, by Worcester P. Bong, December 3, 2020
  Bowers and Bros., Sutler at Fort Whipple, by Mick Woodcock, December 11, 2020
  A Walk Through Whipple Barracks, Part 2, by Mick Woodcock, December 30, 2020
 The Streets of the VA Medical Center, by Worcester P. Bong, January 18, 2022
 The Birdman of Fort Whipple, by Bob Baker, January 25, 2022
  The Forgotten Golf Courses, by Worcester P. Bong, July 24, 2022

#PrescottAZHistory Stories
  Indian War Military Posts of Yavapai County: A Primer, by Drew Desmond, February 4, 2018
  Ft. Whipple 1869: Futile Campaigns and Public Diversions, by Drew Desmond, June 3, 2018
  Prescott's Other History Museum: Ft. Whipple, by Drew Desmond, July 22, 2018
  Buffalo Soldiers March Into Whipple, by Drew Desmond, April 26, 2020

Arizona Territory
Whipple
Buildings and structures in Yavapai County, Arizona
History museums in Arizona
History of Yavapai County, Arizona
Medical museums in the United States
Military and war museums in Arizona
Museums in Prescott, Arizona
1864 establishments in Arizona Territory
Former colonial and territorial capitals in the United States
1913 disestablishments in Arizona